Fox-Strangways is a surname, and may refer to:

 Arthur Henry Fox Strangways (1859-1948), music critic
 Elizabeth Fox, Countess of Ilchester (c.1723–1792), also  Fox-Strangways, wife of the 1st Earl
 Giles Fox-Strangways, 6th Earl of Ilchester (1874–1959)
 Harry Fox-Strangways, 7th Earl of Ilchester (1905–1964)
 Henry Fox-Strangways, 2nd Earl of Ilchester (1747–1802)
 Henry Fox-Strangways, 3rd Earl of Ilchester (1787–1858)
 Henry Fox-Strangways, 5th Earl of Ilchester (1847–1905)
 John Fox-Strangways  (1803–1859), British diplomat, third son of the 2nd Earl
 Mary Fox-Strangways, Countess of Ilchester (1852–1935), Anglo-Irish noblewoman, wife of the 5th Earl
 Maurice Fox-Strangways, 9th Earl of Ilchester (1920–2006)
 Stephen Fox-Strangways, 1st Earl of Ilchester (1704–1776), surname to 1758 Fox 
 Walter Angelo Fox-Strangways, 8th Earl of Ilchester (1887–1970)
 Vivian Fox-Strangways (1898-1974), his brother
 William Fox-Strangways, 4th Earl of Ilchester (1795–1865), Fellow of the Royal Society

See also
 Strangways